Shoksha is a rural locality (a village) in Ustretskoye Rural Settlement, Syamzhensky District, Vologda Oblast, Russia. The population was 165 as of 2002. There are 5 streets.

Geography 
Shoksha is located 15 km west of Syamzha (the district's administrative centre) by road. Slobodka is the nearest rural locality.

References 

Rural localities in Syamzhensky District